Buang Rural LLG is a local-level government (LLG) of Morobe Province, Papua New Guinea.

Wards
01. Bugiau
02. Wagau
03. Mambumb
04. Muniau
05. Aiyayok
06. Rari/Bugweb
07. Dawong
08. Lomalom
09. Bulandem
10. Chimburuk
11. Mapos 1
12. Mapos 2
13. Sagaiyo
14. Pepekane
15. Lagis/Tokane
16. Mangga
17. Bayamatu
18. Kwasang
19. Zeri
20. Zamondang/Bayauaga

References

Local-level governments of Morobe Province